De Bente was a village in the Netherlands and part of the Coevorden municipality in Drenthe. De Bente merged into Dalen in the 19th century.

References 

Coevorden
Former populated places in the Netherlands